Marcus Peters (born January 9, 1993) is an American football cornerback who is a free agent. He was drafted by the Kansas City Chiefs in the first round of the 2015 NFL Draft and was also a member of the Los Angeles Rams. He played college football at Washington.

Early years
Peters attended and graduated from McClymonds High School in Oakland, California, where he played football and ran track. He played as a cornerback for coach Curtis McCauley. As a senior, he notched seven interceptions and scored six touchdowns on kick or punt returns. He also played wide receiver and kicker. He was named the MVP of the Oakland Athletic League, as he led the Warriors to a 12–0 record, the school's first perfect season.

In track & field, Peters competed as a sprinter. and as a senior he won the 100 meters (10.87 s) and 200 meters (22.91 s) events at the Oakland Athletic League Championships.

Peters was a three-star recruit by Rivals.com and the 30th best cornerback in his class. He committed to play college football at the University of Washington in January 2011.

College career
Peters was redshirted as a freshman in 2011. As a redshirt freshman in 2012, Peters started eight of 13 games, recording 44 tackles, three interceptions and a touchdown. As a sophomore in 2013, he started 12 of 13 games and had five interceptions, 55 tackles and one sack. As a junior in 2014, Peters was suspended one game for a "sideline tantrum". He was later dismissed from the team in November for disciplinary issues.

College statistics

Professional career
On December 16, 2014, Peters announced his decision to forgo his remaining eligibility and enter the 2015 NFL Draft. Peters attended the NFL Scouting Combine and completed all of the combine and positional drills. On April 2, 2015, Peters participated at Washington’s Pro Day, but opted to stand on his combine numbers and only performed positional drills. Peters attended pre-draft visits with multiple teams, including the Kansas City Chiefs, New York Jets, New Orleans Saints, San Francisco 49ers, Oakland Raiders, Pittsburgh Steelers, Baltimore Ravens, and Houston Texans. He also attended a private workout with the Atlanta Falcons. At the conclusion of the pre-draft process, Peters was projected to be a first or second round pick by NFL draft experts and scouts. He was ranked as the second best cornerback in the draft by Sports Illustrated, was ranked the third best cornerback by NFL analysts Mike Mayock and Charles Davis, and was ranked the fourth best cornerback prospect by DraftScout.com.

Kansas City Chiefs
The Kansas City Chiefs selected Peters in the first round (18th overall) of the 2015 NFL Draft. Peters was the third cornerback drafted in 2015 and also became the highest defensive back drafted from Washington since Dana Hall (18th overall) in 1992.

2015 season
On May 15, 2015, the Kansas City Chiefs signed Peters to a fully guaranteed four-year, $9.58 million contract that includes a signing bonus of $5.23 million.

Throughout training camp, Peters competed against Phillip Gaines to be a starting cornerback. Head coach Andy Reid named Peters the No. 1 cornerback to begin the regular season after Sean Smith received a three-game suspension.

Peters made his NFL debut and first career start in the season-opener at the Houston Texans and recorded seven combined tackles, three pass deflections, and made his first NFL interception during their 27–20 victory. He would record his first career reception on his first career snap. The following week, Peters recorded five solo tackles, made a season-high four pass deflections, and returned an interception for his first NFL touchdown during a 31–24 loss against the Denver Broncos in Week 2. Peters intercepted a pass attempt by quarterback Peyton Manning, that was intended for wide receiver Demaryius Thomas, and returned it for a 55-yard touchdown in the second quarter. In Week 5, he collected a season-high seven solo tackles and deflected one pass as the Chiefs lost 18–17 to the Chicago Bears. On December 20, 2015, Peters made three combined tackles, tied his season-high of four pass deflections, made two interceptions, and returned one for a touchdown in a 34–14 win at the Baltimore Ravens in Week 15. Peters intercepted a pass thrown by Ravens’ quarterback Jimmy Clausen, that was intended for tight end Daniel Brown, and returned it for a 90-yard touchdown in the fourth quarter. On December 22, 2015, it was announced that Peters was one of three rookies voted to play in the 2016 Pro Bowl.

Peters started in all 16 games during his rookie season in 2015 and recorded 60 combined tackles (53 solo), 26 pass deflections, eight interceptions, two touchdowns, and a forced fumble. He set career-highs in tackles, pass deflections, and interceptions. His eight interceptions tied Bengals free safety Reggie Nelson for the most interceptions in 2015.

Peters received multiple honors as a rookie in 2015, including second-team All-Pro, Associated Press Defensive Rookie of the Year, and was a finalist for the Pepsi Rookie of the Year award. Peters was the fourth Chiefs’ player to win defensive rookie of the year joining Dale Carter, Bill Maas, and Pro Football Hall of Famer Derrick Thomas. He was ranked 65th by his fellow players on the NFL Top 100 Players of 2016.

The Chiefs finished second in the AFC West with an 11–5 record and earned a wildcard berth. On January 9, 2016, Peters started in his first NFL playoff game and made four combined tackles, a pass deflection, and intercepted a pass by Brian Hoyer as the Chiefs defeated the Houston Texans 30–0 during the AFC Wildcard Game. The following week, Peters recorded five combined tackles and deflected two passes during a 27–20 loss at the New England Patriots in the AFC Divisional Round.

2016 season

Peters entered training camp slated as the No. 1 cornerback after Sean Smith departed in free agency. Head coach Andy Reid named Peters and Phillip Gaines the starting cornerback tandem in 2016. During Week 2, Peters recorded a season-high seven combined tackles, made four pass deflections, and intercepted Brock Osweiler twice during a 19–12 loss at the Houston Texans. The following week, Peters made one tackle, two pass deflections, and two interceptions off Jets’ quarterback Ryan Fitzpatrick as the Chiefs defeated the New York Jets 24–3 in Week 3. He was inactive for the Chiefs' Week 11 loss to the Tampa Bay Buccaneers after suffering a hip pointer the previous week.

Peters finished his second season with 45 combined tackles (35 solo), 20 passes defensed, six interceptions, and a forced fumble in 15 games and starts. Peters was named to his second career and consecutive Pro Bowl and was named a first-team All-Pro. He was also ranked 32nd on the NFL Top 100 Players of 2017. Peters’ six interceptions tied for second in the league in 2016.

2017 season
Peters retained his role as the No. 1 starting cornerback in 2017 and started the season opposite Terrance Mitchell. On October 27, 2017, Peters was fined $9,115 for a helmet hit on Oakland Raiders quarterback Derek Carr in the 31–30 road loss. During Week 12, he collected a season-high six solo tackles during a 16–10 loss to the Buffalo Bills. In the next game against the New York Jets, Peters threw a penalty flag into the crowd after his teammate Steven Nelson was flagged for defensive holding while the Jets were attempting a two-point conversion. Peters was flagged for unsportsmanlike conduct for throwing side judge Keith Washington's flag into the crowd; the holding penalty was accepted while the unsportsmanlike penalty was declined. Peters was seemingly ejected, but instead retreated to the locker room and later returned, but did not play for the remainder of the 38–31 loss.

On December 6, 2017, the Chiefs announced their decision to suspend Peters for the next game. Three days after the suspension was announced, it was revealed that Peters’ suspension also was the result of an argument he got into with an unnamed coach for the Chiefs. On December 8, 2017, he received a $24,309 fine from the NFL for an unsportsmanlike conduct penalty stemming from the incident involving the penalty flag. During Week 15, Peters recorded three solo tackles, deflected three passes, and also intercepted Philip Rivers twice during a 30–13 win against the Los Angeles Chargers. His performance earned him AFC Defensive Player of the Week. Peters was inactive for the Chiefs’ Week 17 victory at the Denver Broncos.

Peters finished his third season with 46 combined tackles (42 solo), nine passes defensed, five interceptions, and four forced fumbles in 14 games and 14 starts. Peters led the Kansas City Chiefs in interceptions for the third consecutive season. Peters received an overall grade of 85.7 from Pro Football Focus, which ranked as the 17th best grade among all qualified cornerbacks in 2017. He was ranked 79th by his peers on the NFL Top 100 Players of 2018.

Los Angeles Rams
On March 14, 2018, the Kansas City Chiefs traded Peters and a sixth round pick (209th overall) in the 2018 NFL Draft to the Los Angeles Rams for a fourth round pick (124th overall) in 2018 and second round pick in the 2019 NFL Draft. On April 24, the Rams exercised the fifth-year option on Peters' contract. Head coach Sean McVay named Peters and Aqib Talib the starting cornerbacks to begin the regular season.

2018 season
Peters started in the season-opener at the Oakland Raiders and made three combined tackles, deflected a pass, and returned an interception thrown by Derek Carr for a 50-yard touchdown during the fourth quarter of the 33–13 victory. On September 14, 2018, he was fined $13,000 for an endzone celebration. During Week 4, Peters collected a season-high six solo tackles in a 38–31 victory against the Minnesota Vikings.

Peters started in all 16 games in 2018 and recorded 43 combined tackles (33 solo), eight pass deflections, three interceptions, and a touchdown. Peters received an overall grade of 60.1 from Pro Football Focus, which ranked 95th among all qualified cornerbacks in 2018.

The Rams finished atop the NFC West with a 13–3 record and earned a first-round bye. They went on to defeat the Dallas Cowboys 30–22 in the NFC Divisional Round and defeated the New Orleans Saints 26–23 in overtime in the NFC Championship Game. The victory advanced the Los Angeles Rams to Super Bowl LIII against the New England Patriots. In the Super Bowl, Peters recorded 7 tackles and 1 pass defended, but the Rams lost 13–3.

2019 season
During Week 4 against the Tampa Bay Buccaneers, Peters recorded a 32-yard pick-six off Jameis Winston in the 55–40 loss. In the next game against the Seattle Seahawks, he recovered a fumble by wide receiver Jaron Brown in the narrow 30–29 road loss. In the next game against the San Francisco 49ers, Peters recorded an interception off of Jimmy Garoppolo in the 20–7 loss.

Baltimore Ravens
On October 15, 2019, Peters was traded to the Baltimore Ravens in exchange for linebacker Kenny Young and a 2020 fifth-round selection.

2019 season

During Week 7, Peters played his first game as a Raven against the Seahawks. In that game, he intercepted a pass from Russell Wilson and returned it for a 67-yard pick six in the 30–16 road victory. Peters’ interception was Wilson’s first on the season, and Wilson’s first interception in his last 207 pass attempts. Three weeks later against the Cincinnati Bengals, Peters recorded an 89 yard pick six off a pass thrown by Ryan Finley in the 49–13 road victory. Two weeks later against the Los Angeles Rams, he intercepted a pass thrown by former teammate Jared Goff in the 45–6 road victory. After the game, Peters and Rams cornerback Jalen Ramsey, for whom the Rams traded hours after trading Peters to the Ravens, had an altercation on field which carried over into the tunnel to the locker room.

On December 28, 2019, Peters signed a three-year, $42-million contract extension with the Ravens.

2020 season
In Week 2 against the Houston Texans, Peters recorded his first interception of the season off a pass thrown by Deshaun Watson during the 33–16 win.
In Week 5 against the Cincinnati Bengals, Peters recorded a sack on Joe Burrow and intercepted a pass thrown by Burrow during the 27–3 win.
In Week 9 against the Indianapolis Colts, Peters intercepted a pass thrown by Philip Rivers and forced a fumble on running back Jonathan Taylor that was recovered and returned by teammate Chuck Clark for a 65 yard touchdown during the 24–10 win.

On January 10, 2021, in the AFC Wild Card playoffs, Peters intercepted a pass thrown by Tennessee Titans quarterback Ryan Tannehill with 1:58 remaining in the 4th quarter to help seal a 20–13 win.

2021 season
On September 8, 2021, Peters tore his ACL during practice. He was placed on injured reserve the following day.

2022 season
After missing Week 1, Peters would return to his starting role alongside fellow cornerback Marlon Humphrey. In a Week 3 37–26 win over the New England Patriots, Peters had a solo tackle, returned an interception eight yards, forced a fumble, and recovered another fumble.

NFL career statistics

Regular season

Postseason

Arena Football
On May 12, 2022, Peters joined the FCF Beasts as an owner.

See also
 Washington Huskies football statistical leaders

References

External links

 Washington Huskies profile
 Kansas City Chiefs profile

1993 births
Living people
American Conference Pro Bowl players
American football cornerbacks
Baltimore Ravens players
Kansas City Chiefs players
Los Angeles Rams players
Players of American football from Oakland, California
Unconferenced Pro Bowl players
Washington Huskies football players
National Football League Defensive Rookie of the Year Award winners
Ed Block Courage Award recipients